Jonathan Knight (November 22, 1787 – November 22, 1858) was an American politician who served as an Opposition Party member of the U.S. House of Representatives for Pennsylvania's 20th congressional district from 1855 to 1857.  He also served as a member of the Pennsylvania Senate for the 20th district from 1822 to 1828.  He was a civil engineer who worked on the National Road and as the first chief engineer of B&O Railroad.

Early life
Jonathan Knight was born in Bucks County, Pennsylvania, the tenth child of Abel and Anna S. Knight.  In 1801, he moved with his parents to East Bethlehem Township, Pennsylvania. He attended the common schools, worked as a teacher and purchased a farm.  He continued to do survey work and became a civil engineer. He was appointed by the state in 1816 to make and report on a map of Washington County, Pennsylvania. He was elected county commissioner and served three years.

Railroad career
Knight assisted in the preliminary surveys of the Chesapeake and Ohio Canal and the National Road between Cumberland, Maryland, and Wheeling, Virginia (now West Virginia).  In 1828 he entered the service of the Baltimore and Ohio Railroad (B&O) to help create an engineering staff for the new company. Later that year the B&O sent him to England to study railroad engineering. Upon his return in 1830, he was appointed Chief Engineer of the B&O and served until 1842.  He worked with Dr. William Howard, Lt. Col Stephen H. Long and led the design work of the B&O Main Line from Baltimore, Maryland to Harpers Ferry, West Virginia, the oldest common carrier rail line in the United States. He also led the engineering work on the B&O Washington Branch between Baltimore and Washington, D.C.

Knight also engaged in agricultural pursuits and was secretary of the first agricultural society organized in Washington County.

Political career
Knight served as a member of the Pennsylvania Senate for the 20th district from 1822 to 1828.

Knight was elected as an Opposition Party candidate to the Thirty-fourth Congress.  He was an unsuccessful candidate for reelection in 1856, and for election in 1858.  He resumed agricultural pursuits near East Bethlehem, Pennsylvania, and died there in 1858.  Interment was in Westland Cemetery in Centerville, Pennsylvania.

Legacy
Knightstown, Indiana was named in his honor.

Bibliography
Knight, Jonathan. Report Upon the Locomotive Engines: And the Police and Management of Several of the Principal Rail Roads in the Northern and Middle States, Being a Sequel to the Report... Upon Railway Structures. Lucas & Deaver., 1838.

Footnotes

Sources

 
 The Political Graveyard (Lawrence Kestenbaum, Ann Arbor, MI)."Jonathan Knight" Accessed 2013-03-17.

|-

1787 births
1858 deaths
19th-century American politicians
19th-century American railroad executives
American railroad pioneers
Baltimore and Ohio Railroad people
Burials in Pennsylvania
Engineers from Pennsylvania
Opposition Party members of the United States House of Representatives from Pennsylvania
Pennsylvania state senators
People from Bucks County, Pennsylvania
American railway civil engineers
Washington County Commissioners (Pennsylvania)